Henry Leon Feffer (January 15, 1918May 9, 2011) of Bethesda, Maryland, was an American neurosurgeon.  In the mid-1950s, he was one of the first medical doctors to systematically test whether low-back pain could be relieved with epidural injections of hydrocortisone. Today, physicians routinely give such injections before resorting to more invasive surgery. He was a Washington, D.C. spinal surgeon for more than four decades whose patients included Saddam Hussein.

Early life and childhood
Feffer was born on January 15, 1918, in New York.

Education
He graduated from Indiana University, and from the Indiana University School of Medicine.
His orthopedic surgery internship was in The Gallinger Municipal Hospital in Washington, D.C. which later became, the now defunct, District of Columbia General Hospital.

Career
He was an emeritus professor at George Washington University Medical School.

Death
Feffer died on May 9, 2011, of congestive heart failure at 93.

References

1918 births
2011 deaths
American neurosurgeons
Indiana University School of Medicine alumni
George Washington University faculty
Howard University faculty